Mohiuddin Ahmed (born 10 May 1941) is a politician from Munshiganj District of Bangladesh. He was elected a member of parliament from Munshiganj-4 in 1986 Bangladeshi general election.

Birth and early life 
Mohiuddin Ahmed was born in the village of Kaizjar Char in the Banglabazar Union of Munshiganj, son of Osman Gani and his wife Maluda Begum. He passed SSC from Munshiganj High School in 1981 and HSC and graduation from Government Horganga College. Later he studied at the University of Dhaka.

Career 
Mohiuddin Ahmed was the sports secretary of the central Chhatra League three times. He is the president of Munshiganj district Awami League and chairman of Munshiganj district council. He was the Chief Security Officer of Sheikh Mujibur Rahman. He was elected a Member of Parliament from Munshiganj-4 constituency as an Bangladesh Awami League candidate in the 1986 Bangladeshi general election.

References 

Living people
1941 births
People from Munshiganj District
Awami League politicians
3rd Jatiya Sangsad members
University of Dhaka alumni